Astrothelium carassense is a species of corticolous (bark-dwelling), crustose lichen in the family Trypetheliaceae. Found in Brazil, it was formally described as a new species in 2016 by Robert Lücking, Matthew Nelsen, and Marcelo Marcelli. The pseudostromata are covered with an orange anthraquinone compound. The species epithet carassense refers to the type locality. Astrothelium purpurascens is somewhat similar in appearance to A. carassense, but it lacks pseudostromatic pigment and has slightly smaller ascospores.

References

carassense
Lichen species
Lichens described in 2016
Taxa named by Robert Lücking
Lichens of Brazil